The 2011–12 Regional Super50 was the 38th season of the Regional Super50, the domestic limited-overs cricket competition for the countries of the West Indies Cricket Board (WICB). All matches in the competition, which was the first edition to be branded as the Regional Super50, were held in Guyana.

Eight teams contested the competition – the six regular teams of West Indian domestic cricket (Barbados, Guyana, Jamaica, the Leeward Islands, Trinidad and Tobago, and the Windward Islands), and two development teams (Combined Campuses and Colleges and the Sagicor High Performance Centre). In the tournament final, played at Guyana National Stadium, Jamaica defeated Trinidad and Tobago by five wickets to win an  eighth domestic one-day title. The two joint winners from the previous season, Barbados and the Leewards, both failed to win a game. Two Trinidadians, Jason Mohammed and Sunil Narine, led the tournament in runs and wickets, respectively.

Squads

 Note: Trinidad and Tobago's Kieron Pollard injured his shoulder in his team's group-stage match against the Leeward Islands, and withdrew from the tournament. He was replaced by Evin Lewis in the squad.

Group stage

Group A

Group B

Finals

Semi-finals

Final

Statistics

Most runs
The top five run scorers (total runs) are included in this table.

Source: CricketArchive

Most wickets

The top five wicket takers are listed in this table, listed by wickets taken and then by bowling average.

Source: CricketArchive

References

2011 in West Indian cricket
2011–12 West Indian cricket season
Regional Super50 seasons
Domestic cricket competitions in 2011–12